The 1983 Porsche Classic was a women's tennis tournament played on indoor hard courts in Filderstadt, West Germany that was part of the 1983 Virginia Slims World Championship Series. The tournament was held from 24 October until 30 October 1983. First-seeded Martina Navratilova won the singles title, her second consecutive, and earned $28,000 first-prize money.

Finals

Singles
 Martina Navratilova defeated  Catherine Tanvier 6–1, 6–2
 It was Navratilova's 14th singles title of the year and the 84th of her career.

Doubles
 Martina Navratilova /  Candy Reynolds defeated  Virginia Ruzici /  Catherine Tanvier 6–2, 6–1
 It was Navratilova's 25th title of the year and the 176th of her career. It was Reynolds' 7th title of the year and the 16th of her career.

Prize money

References

External links
 
 ITF tournament edition details

Porsche Classic
Porsche Tennis Grand Prix
Porsche Classic
1980s in Baden-Württemberg
Porsche Classic
Porsch